Elmira Rafailovna Abdrazakova ; (born 7 October 1994 in Zhelezin District) is a Kazakh-Russian model and beauty pageant titleholder who was crowned Miss Russia 2013 and represented Russia at the Miss Universe 2013 and Miss World 2013 pageants.

Personal life
Born to a Tatar father Rafail Abdrazakov and Russian mother Olga Pshenichnikova, Elmira was raised in Mezhdurechensk, Kemerovo Oblast.

Miss Russia 2013

Abdrazakova was crowned Miss Russia 2013 at the 21st edition of Miss Russia beauty pageant, held at the Concert Hall Barvikha Luxury Village in Moscow on 2 March 2013. She is 5 ft. 9 ins. (1.75 m) tall.  The Miss Russia 2013 final ceremony was televised on the NTV channel on 8 March 2013. The ceremony started with the hit song "Christmas Tree". She was an official representative of Russia at the world's two most prestigious beauty contests, Miss Universe and Miss World.

She was of a victim of racial abuse due to her Tatar background. She closed her social network accounts after repeated abuse by trolls.

Miss World 2013
Elmira represented Russia at the Miss World 2013 pageant, held in Bali, Indonesia on 9 September 2013. She failed to place in the Top 20.

Miss Universe 2013
Abdrazakova later represented Russia at the Miss Universe 2013 pageant in Moscow, Russia, her home country.

References

External links
 Miss Russia Official Website
 The real life Cinderella: Russian Angelina Jolie 
 "'A Gypsy Woman Cannot Be the Face of Russia'" by Alsu Kurmasheva, The Atlantic magazine, 6 March 2013

1994 births
Living people
Russian beauty pageant winners
Russian female models
Tatar people of Russia
Kazakhstani emigrants to Russia
Miss Russia winners
Miss World 2013 delegates
Miss Universe 2013 contestants